Joshua B. Bederson is an American neurosurgeon, Leonard I. Malis, MD/Corinne and Joseph Graber Professor of Neurosurgery, and Chair of Neurosurgery at the Mount Sinai Health System in New York City. He is a Fellow of the American College of Surgeons and an attending neurosurgeon at The Mount Sinai Hospital and Elmhurst Hospital in Elmhurst, Queens.

Bederson is co-author of Treatment of Carotid Disease: A Practitioner's Manual, 12 chapters and 53 peer-reviewed articles.

Education and post-doctoral training
In 1979, Bederson graduated Phi Beta Kappa from Cornell University, where he was the Ivy League Gymnastics All-Around Champion for three years. He earned his M.D. at the University of California, San Francisco in 1984, taking a year off to study sculpture in the master's degree program at New York University and hold a solo art show in New York City.

Bederson completed both his internship and residency at the University of California, San Francisco. During his residency, he also studied neuropathology at the University of Torino in Italy and microvascular and skull-base neurosurgery under Dr. M. Gazi Yasargil at the University Hospitals of Zurich, Switzerland and the University Medical Center in Ljubljana, Slovenia. He completed a fellowship in cerebrovascular surgery at the Barrow Neurological Institute in Arizona under Dr. Robert F. Spetzler.

Professional career
Bederson joined Mount Sinai in 1992 as the Director of the Clinical Program for Cerebrovascular Disorders and served as Vice-Chairman after 2001. From 2002 until 2008 he directed the Neurosurgery Residency Program. He is currently the Chairman of the Department of Neurosurgery.

Bederson established the first basic science laboratory in the Department of Neurosurgery at Mount Sinai, developing models of stroke and subarachnoid hemorrhage. In 2002 he was the first neurosurgeon at Mount Sinai to receive an NIH R01 grant as principal investigator.

A high-ranking member of many cerebrovascular societies, Bederson is chair of the AANS/CNS Cerebrovascular section. With Bederson serving as its Chairman, the American Heart Association Guidelines Writing Group on Subarachnoid Hemorrhage published updated guidelines on stroke treatment. He is also a member of the Society of Neurological Surgery.

Bederson's clinical interests include treatment of intracranial and spinal vascular and tumor pathology, including cerebral aneurysms, arteriovenous malformations, trigeminal neuralgia, tumors of the skull base, carotid artery disease and problems of the cervical and lumbar spine.

Personal life
During his surgical internship, he met and married Isabelle Germano, M.D. who is also Professor of  Neurosurgery at Mount Sinai. They have two daughters.

Honors
1986	San Francisco Neurological Society Henry B. Newman Award
1986	International Microsurgical Society Resident Award
2004	Cornell University Top 25 Distinguished Classmates Award

Books
Bederson JB (Editor) Subarachnoid Hemorrhage: Pathophysiology and Treatment. 1996, American Association of Neurological Surgeons Press, Park Ridge, Illinois, 283 Pages. Library of Congress .
Bederson JB, Tuhrim S (Editors), Bederson JB, Tuhrin, S (Authors) Treatment of Carotid Disease: A Practitioner's Manual. 1998, American Association of Neurological Surgeons Press, Park Ridge, Illinois, 256 pages. Library of Congress .

Book chapters
Partial list:

Bederson JB, Wilson CB. "Surgical Treatment of Olfactory Groove Meningiomas." In: AANS Neurosurgical Operative Atlas, pages 77–85, 1991.
Bederson JB. "Pathophysiology and Animal Models of Dural Arteriovenous Malformations." In: Awad I and Barrow D, eds, Dural Arteriovenous Malformations. American Association of Neurological Surgeons, Park Ridge, Illinois, pp 23–34, 1993.
Bederson JB. "Hemodynamics of Giant Intracranial Aneurysms." In: Awad I and Barrow D, eds, Giant Intracranial Aneurysms. American Association of Neurological Surgeons, Park Ridge, Illinois, pp 13–22, 1995.
Bederson JB. "Trigeminal Neuralgia." In: Rakel RE (ed), Conn's Current Therapy. WB Saunders Co, Phila, PA, pp 900–902, 1996.
Bederson JB. "Mechanisms of Acute Brain Injury after Subarachnoid Hemorrhage." In: Bederson JB (ed), Subarachnoid Hemorrhage: Pathophysiology and Treatment. American Association of Neurological Surgeons Press, Park Ridge, Illinois, pp 61–76, 1996.
Ullman J, Bederson JB. "Spinal Arteriovenous Malformations: Pathophysiology and Hemodynamics." In: Barrow D, Awad I (eds), Spinal Vascular Malformations. American Association of Neurological Surgeons Press, Park Ridge, Illinois, pp 37–43, 1998.
Bederson JB, Batjer HH, Stieg PE, Zabramski JM, Lee KC. "Management of Severe Subarachnoid Hemorrhage." In: Fisher WS (ed), Perspectives in Neurological Surgery.  (9):111–128, 1998.
Tuhrim S, Bederson JB. "Patient Selection for Carotid Endarterectomy." In: Bederson JB, Tuhrim S, (eds), Treatment of Carotid Disease: A Practitioner's Manual. American Association of Neurological Surgeons Press, Park Ridge, Illinois, pp 129–142, 1998.
Bederson JB. "Carotid Endarterectomy: Description, Complications, and Adjuncts." In: Bederson JB, Tuhrim S (eds), Treatment of Carotid Disease: A Practitioner's Manual., American Association of Neurological Surgeons Press, Park Ridge, Illinois, pp 167–180, 1998.
Bederson JB. "Cerebrovascular Applications of Image Guidance." In: Germano IM (ed), Advances in Image-Guided Brain and Spine Surgery. Thieme, New York, NY, pp 121–131, 2002.

Publications
Partial list:

Costantino PD, Chaplin JM, Wolpoe ME, Catalano PJ, Sen C, Bederson JB, Govindaraj S. "Applications of fast-setting hydroxyapatite cement: cranioplasty" [In Process Citation]. Otolaryngol Head Neck Surg 2000, 123, 409-412. 
Bederson JB, Chair, Awad I, Rosenwasser R, Weibers D, Piepgras D, Hademenos G, Members. "Guidelines for the management of unruptured intracranial aneurysms. A statement for healthcare professionals from a special writing group of the Stroke Council, American Heart Association." Stroke, 2000, 31, 2742–2750. 
Wright P, Horowitz D, Tuhrim S, Bederson JB. "Clinical improvement related to thrombolysis of third ventricular blood clot in a patient with thalamic hemorrhage." Journal of Stroke and Cerebrovascular Disease 10:23-26, 2001. 
Patel AB, Gandhi CD, Bederson JB. "Angiographic documentation of a persistent otic artery." AJNR Am J Neuroradiology 2003. 24(1): 124-6. 
Bederson JB, Levy AL, Ding WH, Kahn R, DiPerna CA, Jenkins AL 3rd, Vallabhajosyula P. Acute vasoconstriction after subarachnoid hemorrhage. Neurosurgery. 1998 Feb;42(2):352-60; discussion 360-2. 
Naff NJ, Hanley DF, Keyl PM, Tuhrim S, Kraut M, Bederson J, Bullock R, Mayer SA, Schmutzhard E. "Intraventricular thrombolysis speeds blood clot resolution: results of a pilot, prospective, randomized double-blind, controlled trial." Neurosurgery 2004. 54(3): 577-83; discussion 583-4. 
Sehba FA, Mostafa G, Knopman J, Bederson JB. "Acute alterations in microvascular basal lamina after subarachnoid hemorrhage." J Neurosurg 2004. 101(4): 633-40. 
Sehba FA, Mostafa G, Friedrich V, Bederson JB. "Acute microvascular platelet aggregation after subarachnoid hemorrhage (SAH)." J Neurosurg 2005. 102(6) 1094- 1100. 
Sehba FA, Bederson JB. "Mechanisms of acute brain injury after subarachnoid hemorrhage." Neurol Research 2006.  28(4):381-98. 
Bederson JB, Chair, Batjer HH, Conolly ES, Dacey RG, Duldner J, Diringer M, Harbaugh RE, Dion JJ, Patel AB, Rosenwasser RH, Members. "Guidelines for the management of aneurysmal subarachnoid hemorrhage. A statement for healthcare professionals from a special writing group of the Stroke Council." American Heart Association. Stroke Dec, 2006. 
Eloy JA, Fatterpekar GM, Bederson JB, Shohet MR. "Intracranial mucocele: an unusual complication of cerebrospinal fluid leakage repair with middle turbinate mucosal graft.  J. Otolaryngology–Head and Neck Surgery, 2007. 
Eloy JA, Bederson JB, Smouha EE. "Petrous apex aspergillosis as a long-term complication of cholesterol granuloma: case report and review of the literature." Laryngoscope Journal, 2007. 
Sehba FA, Flores R, Muller A, Friedrich V, Chen JF, Britz GW, Winn HR, Bederson JB. "Adenosine A(2A) receptors in early ischemic vascular injury after subarachnoid hemorrhage." J Neurosurg. 6 November 2009. 
 Meyers PM, Schumacher HC, Higashida RT, Derdeyn CP, Nesbit GM, Sacks D, Wechsler LR, Bederson JB, Lavine SD, Rasmussen P; American Society of Interventional Neuroradiology; Society of Interventional Radiology. "Reporting standards for endovascular repair of saccular intracranial cerebral aneurysms." J Vasc Interv Radiol. 2009 Jul. 
 Gilad R, Fatterpekar GM, Gandhi CD, Winn HR, Johnson DM, Patel AB, Bederson JB, Naidich TP. "Intracranial tumors: cisternal angle as a measure of midbrain compression for assessing risk of postembolization clinical deterioration." Radiology. 2009 Jun. 
 Meyers PM, Schumacher HC, Higashida RT, Derdeyn CP, Nesbit GM, Sacks D, Wechsler LR, Bederson JB, Lavine SD, Rasmussen P. "Reporting standards for endovascular repair of saccular intracranial cerebral aneurysms." Stroke. 2009 May. 
 Bederson JB, Connolly ES Jr, Batjer HH, Dacey RG, Dion JE, Diringer MN, Duldner JE Jr, Harbaugh RE, Patel AB, Rosenwasser RH; American Heart Association. "Guidelines for the management of aneurysmal subarachnoid hemorrhage: a statement for healthcare professionals from a special writing group of the Stroke Council, American Heart Association." Stroke. 2009 Mar. 
 Gologorsky Y, Meyer SA, Post AF, Winn HR, Patel AB, Bederson JB. "Novel surgical treatment of a transverse-sigmoid sinus aneurysm presenting as pulsatile tinnitus: technical case report." Neurosurgery. 2009 Feb. PMID
 Eloy JA, Carneiro E, Vibhute P, Genden EM, Bederson JB, Som PM. "A rare prevertebral ordinary lipoma presenting as obstructive sleep apnea: computed tomographic and magnetic resonance imaging findings." Arch Otolaryngol Head Neck Surg. 2008 Sep. 
 Gandhi CD, Gilad R, Patel AB, Haridas A, Bederson JB. "Treatment of ruptured lenticulostriate artery aneurysms." J Neurosurg. 2008 Jul. 
 Eloy JA, Carai A, Patel AB, Genden EM, Bederson JB. "Combined endoscope-assisted transclival clipping and endovascular stenting of a basilar trunk aneurysm: case report." Neurosurgery. 2008 Mar. 
 Reis C, Genden EM, Bederson JB, Som PM. "A rare spontaneous osteosarcoma of the calvarium in a patient with long-standing fibrous dysplasia: CT and MR findings." Br J Radiol. 2008 Feb. 
Sehba FA, Friedrich V Jr, Makonnen G, Bederson JB. "Acute cerebral vascular injury after subarachnoid hemorrhage and its prevention by administration of a nitric oxide donor." J Neurosurg. 2007 Feb. 
 Sehba FA, Chereshnev I, Maayani S, Friedrich V Jr, Bederson JB. "Nitric oxide synthase in acute alteration of nitric oxide levels after subarachnoid hemorrhage." Neurosurgery. 2004 Sep. 
 Patel AB, Gandhi CD, Bederson JB. "Angiographic documentation of a persistent otic artery." AJNR Am J Neuroradiol. 2003 Jan. 
 Wright P, Horowitz DR, Tuhrim S, Bederson JB. "Clinical improvement related to thrombolysis of third ventricular blood clot in a patient with thalamic hemorrhage." J Stroke Cerebrovasc Dis. 2001 Jan-Feb. 
 Horowitz DR, Sheinart KF, Bederson JB. "Spontaneous caudate hemorrhage associated with ingestion of a decongestant containing phenylpropanolamine." J Stroke Cerebrovasc Dis. 1999 Mar-Apr.

References

External links
The Mount Sinai Hospital homepage
Icahn School of Medicine at Mount Sinai homepage
Mount Sinai Department of Neurosurgery
Benign brain tumors can cause a range of problems - but they're treatable New York Daily News

1957 births
American medical academics
Cornell University alumni
Icahn School of Medicine at Mount Sinai faculty
American neurosurgeons
University of California, San Francisco alumni
Living people